Mark Stephen Fullbrook (born June 1962) is a British political strategist and lobbyist who served as Downing Street Chief of Staff from September to October 2022.

Early life and education
Fullbrook was born in June 1962. He read management science at the University of Warwick.

Career
Between January 1988 and December 1992, Fullbrook was the Deputy Head of Campaigning for the Conservative Party under Margaret Thatcher and John Major before serving as the Head of Campaigning.

Fullbrook served as a partner and the chief global projects officer of the C/T Group from May 2010 to May 2022 alongside Lynton Crosby, a long-time partner of Fullbrook. He established and briefly served as CEO of his own consultancy firm, Fullbrook Strategies Limited, between May and September 2022, which advised Liz Truss during her ultimately successful Conservative Party leadership campaign. The company ceased commercial trading several days before Fullbrook's appointment to Downing Street.

In his role, Fullbrook had advised former speaker of the United States House of Representatives Newt Gingrich, as well as David Trimble and Boris Johnson between June and July 2019 for his successful Conservative Party leadership campaign. 

He has also advised the Libyan house of representatives and the Sante Group, which was awarded a £680 million PPE grant during the COVID-19 pandemic in the United Kingdom.

He has been interviewed by FBI agents about an alleged criminal plot to bribe the former governor of Puerto Rico, Wanda Vázquez Garced, on behalf of Julio Herrera Velutini, a Venezuelan banker.

Downing Street Chief of Staff
Fullbrook was appointed Downing Street Chief of Staff from September to October 2022, under Liz Truss. The Cabinet Office informed the public that Fullbrook's service for the Prime Minister would be paid through his lobbying company in a highly unusual arrangement that could allow him to pay less tax.

In October 2022 it was reported in the Guardian newspaper that Fullbrook continued to hold a 10% stake in the lobbying business CT Group. In the past clients of CT Group have included Philip Morris (a tobacco company), Glencore (a mining company) and the Saudi Arabian government. The potential conflict of interest had not been publicly disclosed since Fullbrook joined Downing Street as Liz Truss’s chief of staff. Fullbrook left CT Group earlier in 2022. During Fullbrook’s time as a director of CT Group the company ran a Worldwide campaign to promote the burning of coal on behalf of mining company Glencore. The Saudi Arabian government paid CT Group millions of pounds for work in the UK.  Russian oligarchs keen to improve their reputations in the west were also clients of CT Group during Fullbrook's tenure there.

Fullbrook left office as Downing Street chief of staff after Truss' resignation as prime minister, making him the shortest-serving chief of staff. He was succeeded by Liam Booth-Smith.

Personal life
Fullbrook lives in Winchfield. He is married to Lorraine Fullbrook, a former Conservative MP, who was made a life peer by Boris Johnson in 2020.

References

1962 births
Alumni of the University of Warwick
British consultants
British lobbyists
British special advisers
Conservative Party (UK) people
Downing Street Chiefs of Staff
Living people